Gregor Breinburg (born 16 September 1991) is a professional footballer who plays as a midfielder for ADO Den Haag in the Dutch Eerste Divisie. Born in the Netherlands, he represents the Aruba national team.

Club career
He formerly played for De Graafschap and joined NEC in 2014. After a solid 2015 season, he was appointed captain of NEC at the start of the 2016 season.

International career
Breinburg made his debut for Aruba in a June 2015 FIFA World Cup qualification match against Barbados and has, as of October 2022, earned a total of 15 caps scoring 2 goals. He represented his country in 4 World Cup qualifiers.

Career statistics

Club

International

Scores and results list Aruba's goal tally first, score column indicates score after each Breinburg goal.

References

External links

 

1991 births
Living people
Footballers from Arnhem
Dutch people of Aruban descent
Association football midfielders
Dutch footballers
Aruban footballers
Aruba international footballers
De Graafschap players
NEC Nijmegen players
Sparta Rotterdam players
ADO Den Haag players
Eredivisie players
Eerste Divisie players